Silver Mountain, elevation , is a mountain in Huerfano County, Colorado. It is part of the southern Sangre de Cristo Range of the Southern Rocky Mountains of North America. Silver Mountain is located northeast of Mount Mestas and north of the Spanish Peaks.

Earlier name
The mountain used to be called Dike Mountain for the numerous magmatic dikes that radiate out from its base. The name was changed in the 1870s after miners discovered gold and silver deposits there.

References 

 

Mountains of Huerfano County, Colorado
North American 3000 m summits
Sangre de Cristo Mountains